Larache is a province in the Moroccan region of Tanger-Tetouan-Al Hoceima. Its population in 2004 was 472,386.

The major cities and towns are:
 Khemis Sahel
 Ksar el Kebir
 Larache

Subdivisions
The province is divided administratively into the following:

References

 
Larache
Geography of Tanger-Tetouan-Al Hoceima